Georgy Petrovich Kamnev (born October 5, 1983, Serdobsk, Penza Oblast, USSR), Russian politician, Deputy Legislative Assembly of the Penza Region. Head (First Secretary) of the Penza regional branch of the CPRF. Since May 27, 2017, he has been a member of the Presidium Central Committee of the CPRF.

Education 
He was born on October 5, 1983, in the town of Serdobsk, Penza region, in the family of workers of the Serdobsk watch factory. In 2005, he graduated with honours from the Faculty of Law Penza State University, then he went on to take his post-graduate course. ... In 2005 he became a laureate of the regional competition "Young Lawyer of the Year". In 2008 he completed his postgraduate course in law. He repeatedly took part and won All-Russian and international competitions and conferences of legal scholars. His area of research is the problems of formation and activity of local self-government bodies.

Career 

In 2001 he joined the CPRF.

From 2002 to 2006 he was an assistant to the deputy of the Penza City Duma.

From 2004 to 2009 he was a voting member of the election commission of the city of Penza, secretary of the commission.

In 2005–2006 he worked as the director of the Penza representative office of the insurance company "Standard-Reserve".

From 2006 to 2008, he worked at Energy Service Company LLC.

From 2006 to 2007 he became Chairman of the Youth Council at the Penza City Duma.

From 2006 to 2009, he headed the regional organization LYCL RF.

From 2006 to 2011 he worked as assistant to the deputy of the State Duma of Russia Viktor Ilyukhin.

From 2008 to 2010, he held various positions in the companies of the SCM Group holding.

In 2010, he founded and headed the Yurex Group law firm, providing legal services in the housing sector.

In the elections to the State Duma of the Federal Assembly of the Russian Federation of VII convocation (2016), he stood for the 146th Penza single-mandate constituency, Penza region, he also was on the federal list from the Communist Party of the Russian Federation.

He has 9 published research works. He repeatedly participated and won All-Russian and international competitions and conferences of legal scholars.

Political activity 

From 2004 to 2011, he was an assistant to the deputy of the State Duma V.I. Ilyukhin.

From 2005 to 2009, he was the first secretary of the Penza regional committee of the Komsomol.

From 2006 to 2008, he was Chairman of the Youth Council at the Penza City Duma.

From 2006 to 2011, he was secretary of the Penza regional committee of the Communist Party.

Since 2011, he has been the first secretary of the Penza regional committee of the Communist Party.

At the time of his election as First Secretary of the Penza Regional Committee of the Communist Party of the Russian Federation on May 21, 2011, Georgy Kamnev was the youngest First Secretary of the Regional Committee of the Communist Party of the Russian Federation in Russia.

On December 24, 2011, by the decision of the plenum of the CPRF regional committee, Georgy Kamnev replaced in the Legislative Assembly of the Penza region of IV convocation the deputy from the Communist Party of the Russian Federation who left for the State Duma Vladimir Simagin.

On the October 14, 2012, he was elected deputy of the Legislative Assembly of V convocation from the Penza regional branch of the Communist Party of the Russian Federation.
 
The party list of the Communist Party of the Russian Federation won 12.52% of the votes, two deputies from the Communist Party of the Russian Federation, Georgy Kamnev and Andrei Zuev, passed to the Legislative Assembly. He is the Deputy Chairman of the Committee for State Construction and Local Self-Government Bodies in the Legislative Assembly of the Penza Region.

From February 24, 2013, he has been a member of the Central Committee of the Communist Party.

After the end of XVII Congress of the CPRF on May 27, 2017, he was elected the Presidium member of the Central Committee of the Communist Party.

Georgy Kamnev supports granting RF citizens the right to carry firearms. According to him, this right will improve the quality of work of public authorities.

He is one of the 324 members of the State Duma the United States Treasury sanctioned on 24 March 2022 in response to the 2022 Russian invasion of Ukraine.

Family 
Georgy Kamnev is married. He has two daughters and a son.

References

Links 

 Page on the website of the Penza regional committee of the Communist Party of the Russian Federation
 Personal page on the official website of the Communist Party
 Personal page on the website of the Legislative Assembly of the Penza region

Russian communists
Penza State University alumni
1983 births
Living people
Eighth convocation members of the State Duma (Russian Federation)
Russian individuals subject to the U.S. Department of the Treasury sanctions